Kenneth Di Vita Jensen (born 22 July 1990) is a Norwegian soccer player of American descent, who is playing as a forward. He notably played for Tippeligaen club Hønefoss.

Career
Di Vita Jensen hails from Hole and joined Hønefoss BK in 2006 as a youth player.  In 2007 and 2008 he played sporadically in the Adeccoligaen and scored a goal against Alta IF, but his playing time was limited by injuries and his youthful inexperience.  In 2009, he went on loan to Jevnaker in the Norwegian Third Division where he became the club's leading scorer.

Hønefoss was promoted to the Tippeligaen after the 2009 season and Di Vita Jensen played an increased role in the team during their top flight campaign.

In 2014, he joined Moss FK, only to play the autumn part of the season for Jevnaker. He scored 13 goals in 12 games here, but left after half a season to play in closer proximity to the Oslo and Akershus University College where he studied. In 2015, he joined Lommedalens IL. His career here became equally short, as he went on to Fredrikstad FK in the summer. Playing just half a year here as well, he signed for Ullern IF ahead of the 2016 season.

International
Di Vita Jensen has appeared for Norway's U-16 and U-17 teams. He is also eligible for the US through his American mother.

Career statistics

References

1990 births
Living people
People from Hole, Norway
People from Ringerike (municipality)
Norwegian people of American descent
Norwegian footballers
Hønefoss BK players
Ullensaker/Kisa IL players
Fredrikstad FK players
Ullern IF players
KFUM-Kameratene Oslo players
Jevnaker IF players
Norwegian First Division players
Eliteserien players
Association football forwards
Sportspeople from Viken (county)